Ama-gi is a Sumerian word written  ama-gi4 or  ama-ar-gi4. It has been translated as "freedom", as well as "manumission", "exemption from debts or obligations", and "the restoration of persons and property to their original status" including the remission of debts. Other interpretations include a "reversion to a previous state" and release from debt, slavery, taxation or punishment.

The word originates from the noun ama "mother" (sometimes with the enclitic dative case marker ar), and the present participle gi4 "return, restore, put back", thus literally meaning "returning to mother". Assyriologist Samuel Noah Kramer has identified it as the first known written reference to the concept of freedom. Referring to its literal meaning "return to the mother", he wrote in 1963 that "we still do not know why this figure of speech came to be used for 'freedom'."

The earliest known usage of the word was in the reforms of Urukagina. By the Third Dynasty of Ur, it was used as a legal term for the manumission of individuals.

It is related to the Akkadian word anduraāru(m), meaning "freedom", "exemption" and "release from (debt) slavery".

A number of libertarian organizations have adopted the cuneiform glyph as a symbol claiming it is "the earliest-known written appearance of the word 'freedom'". It is used as a logo by the Instituto Político para la Libertad of Peru, the New Economic School – Georgia, Libertarian publishing firm Liberty Fund, and was the name and logo of the journal of the London School of Economics' Hayek Society. British musician Frank Turner has the symbol tattooed on his left forearm.

References 

Sumerian words and phrases
Slavery in Asia
Slavery in antiquity